Julie Delance-Feurgard (November 8, 1859 – January 11, 1892) was a French painter. She was known for her landscapes and genre paintings.

Biography
Delance-Feurgard was born on 8 November 1859 in Paris, France. She attended the Académie Julian. She studied under Jean-Léon Gérôme and Léon Bonnat. She was a classmate of the artist Louise Catherine Breslau.

Delance-Feurgard exhibited at the Paris Salon, earning an honourable mention in 1889. She was an associate of the Société Nationale des Beaux-Arts and also exhibited regularly at the Durand-Ruel gallery.

She married painter and teacher Paul-Louis Delance in 1886. She died in Paris on 11 January 1892 at the age of 32.

Delance-Feurgard was included in the 2018 exhibit Women in Paris 1850-1900.

References

External links
 

1859 births 
1892 deaths
19th-century French women artists
Académie Julian alumni